Jasbir Singh Cheema is a Canadian television personality and politician.

In the 2004 federal election, he won the candidate nomination for the Conservative Party of Canada defeating Chuck Cadman, the sitting Member of Parliament for the riding of Surrey North, but Cadman ran and won as an independent candidate.

Cheema anchored the Punjabi newscast on Vancouver television station Channel M now Omni Television from 2003 until 2004.

Cheema was a regular columnist on Real Estate and Economy with the '' writing extensively on Real Estate and Economy between Sep 2008 to May 2011. He is a full-time realtor and is a recipient of President Award from Sutton Group Medallion Realty in 2006. He twice represented FVREB for Government Liaison (GL) Days in Victoria, British Columbia, in April 2010 and April 2012. Cheema also represented FVREB during  sponsored PAC (Political Action Committee) days from May 7–9, 2011 in Ottawa, capital of Canada.

References

  Websters Quotations
  Election results
  Election commentary and bio.

External links
 

Canadian columnists
Canadian people of Indian descent
Canadian Sikhs
Canadian television personalities
Conservative Party of Canada candidates for the Canadian House of Commons
Living people
People from Surrey, British Columbia
Punjabi people
Place of birth missing (living people)
Year of birth missing (living people)